Sisingaan or also known as Gotong Singa, Singa Ungkleuk, Singa Depok, Kuda Ungkleuk, Pergosi or Odong-odong, is a traditional Sundanese lion dance originated from Subang, West Java, Indonesia. This lion dance performance marked by a form of an ark or palanquin that resembles a lion. The lion ark or lion-shaped effigy is carried by a group of dancers who perform various attractions accompanied by traditional music. The lion palanquin is being ride by a children. This dance usually performed to celebrate the child's circumcision ceremony, where the child is carried on a lion around the kampung (village).

Etymology
In Sundanese language the term sisingaan means "imitation lion", "playing the lion" or "lion play". This refers to the form of a lion-like effigy that is the main part of the show.

Form
Unlike other lion dances however, this lion dance is quite different. It uses lion-like statue or an effigy doll that resembles a lion in couchant (lying down) position, being held in a palanquin-like structure by four or two men with bamboo rods. This lion statue is being ride by a children, as the lion being carried away and held high by these men in certain dance movements, sometimes involved acrobatics. The dance is accompanied with a traditional music troupe consists of musicians playing musical instruments; including kendang (drum), kempul, gong, suling bamboo flute and trumpet.

History

At first, the Sundanese people of Subang had an art called "oesungan" which they carried in the form of birds, deer, stealth on a stretcher. At that time there was no stretcher in the form of a lion like this time. Then The Sisingaan was created around 1975 by Sundanese artists, because remembering the arrival of the reog Ponorogo art to the city which was brought by urbanites from Ponorogo.

After the Sundanese artists discussed with the Reog artists who were very different from the Reog Dog-Dog Sundanese, that reog from East Java attracted more attention and had philosophical values ​​and historical records against Dutch colonialism, an art was created that was able to show the distinctive identity of Subang from the ideas of the artist.

Sisingaan was inspired by the Reog series in East Java, which tells of the joy of the journey of King Singa Barong's bodyguards from the kingdom of Lodaya to the Daha kingdom. Even though the king was known to be cruel and arrogant, the guards were always loyal to carry the litter that King Singa Barong slept with.

In addition, as a symbol of the resistance of the people of Subang against Dutch arbitrariness, which is depicted as a lion in the VOC symbol, it is intended as a calming historical learning education for students.

At first, the Sundanese people of Subang had an art called "oesungan" which they carried in the form of birds, deer, stealth on a stretcher. At that time there was no stretcher in the form of a lion like this time

Gallery

See also

 Reog
 Barong
 Dances in Indonesia

References

External links

Dances of Java
Sundanese culture